A list of protected areas of Uzbekistan.

National Parks
Zaamin National Park
Ugam-Chatkal National Park

Reserves
Lower Amudarya State Biosphere Reserve
Chatkal National Reserve
Hissar National Reserve
Kitab National Reserve
Kyzylkum National Reserve
Nurata National Reserve
Surkhan National Reserve
Zaamin National Reserve
Zeravshan National Reserve

Ramsar sites
Aydar Arnasay Lakes System 	
Lake Dengizkul

See also
List of World Heritage Sites in Uzbekistan

References

 
Uzbekistan
Protected areAS